Kingsleya is a genus of crabs in the family Pseudothelphusidae, containing the following species:
Kingsleya attenboroughi Pinheiro & Santana, 2016
Kingsleya besti Magãlhaes, 1990
Kingsleya gustavoi Magãlhaes, 2004
Kingsleya junki Magãlhaes, 2003
Kingsleya latifrons (Rathbun, 1840)
Kingsleya siolii (Bott, 1967)
Kingsleya ytupora Magãlhaes, 1986

References

Pseudothelphusidae